Henry Collingwood Selby was the 11th Queen's Advocate of Ceylon. He was appointed on 23 June 1848, succeeding Arthur William Buller, and held the office until 1858. He was succeeded by Henry Byerley Thomson.

References

Attorneys General of British Ceylon
Members of Gray's Inn